The Humphrey Center, also known as Old Main, is an historic building located on the campus of Grand View University in Des Moines, Iowa, United States. It was listed on the National Register of Historic Places in 1978.

History

The Danish Evangelical Lutheran Church in America began planning Grand View College in 1893, and the school opened in 1896.  This building was completed in 1895 and housed all of Grand View's operations for a half century.  It was designed by Marinus Jensen and Frank James. The Danish Renaissance elements in the building's design was important to the Danish immigrants to the United States who founded the college.  Its features are identical to those found at the Belmont Seminary in Bedford, Virginia.   They are reminiscent of the architectural style that was popular during the reign of King Christian IV (1596-1648). The building contained the residence for the college's president and his family as well as all its students, the cook, and other personnel. The library, classrooms, chapel, bookstore and other facilities were also housed there.

In 1997 the building was renovated and it was renamed the Humphrey Center at that time. It now houses the administrative offices for the university.

References

School buildings completed in 1895
Buildings and structures in Des Moines, Iowa
National Register of Historic Places in Des Moines, Iowa
University and college buildings on the National Register of Historic Places in Iowa
Grand View University
University and college administration buildings in the United States